Macarostola phoenicaula is a moth of the family Gracillariidae. It is known from Fiji.

The larvae feed on Eugenia cumini. They probably mine the leaves of their host plant.

References

Macarostola
Moths described in 1934